The Thiyyar Regiment was a military class created by British Empire that provided thousands of Thiyyar community members from Malabar for the British Indian Army. The Regiment was based in Thalassery, chosen because it was a strategic center in Malabar. There were many Thiyyar people who held the posts of subedar and jemendhar in the local militia under the East India Company, which were considered the high and responsible posts. There were lesser known Thiyya regiments and Thiyyar Pattalam formed by the French and British governments in Mahe and Thalassery. The British deployed the unit in various military operations.

Listen important and education communities of north malabar and until lately, there was a special regiment in malabar. Which has done useful service. Now that this regiment is being disbanded, it is only proper that Thiyyar should be given sufficient representation in  both the rank of malabar battalion, especially in view of the fact that malabar has a enocial territorial force of it. Listen appointed as army sentunies. The letter the of government of the madras october (1932) throws light on the fact about the Thiyyar regiment in malabar early.

Role of Malabar
Nowhere in the Malabar region is an army of only nairs to be seen.  In the Thiyya division itself, various police forces and the military sector were under the French forces. This necessitated the maintenance of a fairly strong force at Thalassery. Personnel were recruited from the local  Tiveys ( Tiyyas ) as regular force to support the European regiment. 51 Native irregulars were also maintained. on the occasions of war.

It is seen mentioned in some documents that this battalion played a major role in Pazhassi Raja British East India Company War. it is stated that, 1802. A European regiment and three battalions of native infantry were to be stationed at Canara in order to withdraw the British troops from Goa;  If they remain at Goa, one regiment and two battalions will suffice for service in Canara.  One regiment and one battalion were to be stationed at Mangalore for detachments in the southern parts of the province;  A battalion in Kundapur. A battalion was to be stationed at Seedasighur in case the British troops were withdrawn from Goa.  One regiment of Europeans, five battalions of native infantry, and three companies of artillery were to be in the province of Malabar, except Wayanad, provided for in the supply to Mysore.

 1. "Seringapatam , 11th March , 1802. a letter from General Stuart , in which he informs me that orders have been received to discharge from the service all the Nair , Tier , and Moplah sebundies in Malabar , and all local and volunteer corps in other parts , and to reduce the numbers of the regular battalions to the peace establish ment of t of 1796 , that is to say , to 900 each battalion. The number of battalions is not to be altered at present . In consequence of this information , I write this day to Colonel Boles to desire that he will make the necessary arrange ments for disbanding the three corps of sebundies . The General has desired that I would suggest to you the propriety of taking into the service , as revenue or police peons , as many of these discharged sebundies as you may be willing to entertain in those capacities , rather than to let loose upon Mala bar at once so large a body of men accustomed to arms . You will be the best judge how far you can attend to this suggestion . If you can take into the service any number of these people , I think the peace of the country will be benefited . The General says that he intends to propose to government that waste land may be given to the discharged sebundies and sepoys in the different parts of the country.

Modern history

Eliza Draper, who was born in British India and married to a British soldier, mentions Thiyyas as "a community bearing arms, though it was mainly the Nairs who had the privilege of carrying arms with them, according to Hindu social customs. But there were a number of Thiyya families known for martial skills and many families were known as gurukkals with Kalaripayattu traditions in the northern parts of Malabar. It is also a known fact that these families were well-versed in Ayurveda and Sanskrit texts and were practitioners of the traditional healing systems."

See also
Cherayi Panikkar

References

Military history of India